Heavy machinery may refer to:

 Heavy equipment
 Heavy industry
 Heavy Machinery (album), an album by Anders Johansson, Jens Johansson and Allan Holdsworth
 Heavy Machinery, a former professional wrestling tag team of Otis and Tucker